Mark Maxey (born May 13, 1969) is an American producer, writer and director of film and television best known for the documentary film Up to Snuff (2019), about musician/composer W. G. Snuffy Walden.

Early life
Mark Maxey was born on May 13, 1969, in Long Beach, California, the son of concert marimbist Linda Maxey and clarinetist Lawrence Maxey. The family moved to Lawrence, Kansas where Maxey's father taught at the University of Kansas School of Music for the next 37 years.

In Lawrence, the Maxey family lived across the street from the Centron film studio, where, as a boy, Maxey first entered the industry in small roles and as an extra.  He was involved in the Lawrence Community Theater while in high school, and worked for the Theater after graduating from Lawrence High School in 1987.

In 1990 he moved to Washington, D.C. to begin working in television production. He became a vice president at Yorktel.

Professional
Maxey is a television and film producer who wrote, directed and produced the documentary film Up to Snuff (2019) about musician and composer W.G. Snuffy Walden. The film is a story of redemption and chronicles Walden's excesses as a touring rock and roll musician in the 1970's and '80's, and his decision to choose sobriety and reinvent himself as a television and film composer.

In 2014, Maxey won an Emmy Award for The Honors: A Salute to American Heroes which he produced. Maxey's other productions include television specials such as American Valor, Salute to Veterans, The Wounded Warrior Experience, and the National Memorial Day Parade, each of which were broadcast nationally on cable television. Maxey also created the PBS primetime special On Stage at the Kennedy Center: A Holiday Concert for the Troops with the late Marvin Hamlisch.

In 2011, Maxey co-founded with Brad Russell the Washington West Film Festival Maxey serves as chairman of the board and Russell as president.

Personal
On September 6, 1998, Maxey married Rebecca Ewing. Together they have two sons and reside the Washington D.C. metro area.

External links
 Official website of Mark Maxey

References

1969 births
Living people
American film producers
American documentary filmmakers
Film directors from Virginia
Screenwriters from Virginia
People from Lawrence, Kansas
People from Loudoun County, Virginia
Television producers from Virginia